Kasapi is a surname. Notable people with the surname include:

 Fetim Kasapi (born 1983), Albanian footballer
 Shpat Kasapi (born 1985), Albanian singer and songwriter
 Vasiliki Kasapi (born 1983), Greek weightlifter

See also
 Kasapis (surname)